The Committee for the Prevention of Destruction of Antiquities on the Temple Mount is an apolitical group of archaeologists, intellectuals and other prominent individuals from the left and right. Its most outspoken member was the prominent archaeologist, Dr. Eilat Mazar of Hebrew University in Jerusalem. 

The group was formed in response to concerns about damage to antiquities at the Temple Mount in Jerusalem by construction work being carried out there.

See also
Temple Mount Sifting Project
Excavations at the Temple Mount

External links
Committee home page
Committee statement of purpose
The Temple Mount Archaeological Destruction

Non-profit organizations based in Israel
Archaeological organizations
Temple Mount

Archaeology of Israel